Eduardo Sotillos Palet (born March 27, 1940) is a Spanish journalist and politician. He served as Spokesperson of the Government of Spain between 1982 and 1985.

Biography 
Born on 27 March 1940 in Madrid. He was the director of Radio Nacional de España (RNE) during the Spanish transition to democracy. He was also the RNE's corresponde to Lisbon and Press Chief of José María de Areilza. Director of the Telediario in Televisión Española, he affiliated to the Spanish Socialist Workers' Party (PSOE) in 1979.

Following the victory of the PSOE in the 1982 general election he was appointed as Spokesperson of the Government of Spain, serving until 1985.

He was municipal councillor in Pozuelo de Alarcón from 1991 to 1994.

He left the PSOE circa 2015.

Awards 
 Premio APM de Honor (1997)

References 

Spanish journalists
City councillors in the Community of Madrid
Pozuelo de Alarcón
1940 births
Living people